Bainbridge Bunting (November 23, 1913 – February 13, 1981) was an American architectural historian, teacher and author.

Bunting received his Ph.D. from Harvard University. Beginning in 1948, he was a faculty member of the University of New Mexico Art Department until his retirement in 1979. Bunting wrote numerous articles and three books on the architecture of New Mexico, and was noted for his expertise in adobe architecture, the Zuni Pueblo and the architecture of John Gaw Meem.

Bunting is credited by architectural historian Marcus Whiffen with having re-introduced the term "Châteauesque" to describe the architectural style previously and more generally known as "Chateau Style" or "French Chateau Style.".

Writings

 Houses of Boston's Back Bay: An Architectural History, 1840–1917
 Harvard: An Architectural History (Belknap Press)
 Early Architecture in New Mexico University of New Mexico Press, Albuquerque, 1976  
 Taos adobes : Spanish colonial and territorial architecture of the Taos
 Survey of Architectural History in Cambridge
 John Gaw Meem: Southwestern Architect,  School of American Research Book, University of New Mexico Press, Albuquerque, NM, 1983
 Of Earth and Timbers Made: New Mexico Architecture

References

External links 

 Bainbridge Bunting Papers, University of New Mexico, Center for Southwest Research

1913 births
1981 deaths
Writers from Kansas City, Missouri
American architecture writers
University of New Mexico faculty
People from Albuquerque, New Mexico
Harvard University alumni
20th-century American non-fiction writers
20th-century American male writers
American male non-fiction writers